Geany (IPA:dʒiːni  ) is a free and open-source lightweight GUI text editor using Scintilla and GTK, including basic IDE features. It is designed to have short load times, with limited dependency on separate packages or external libraries on Linux. It has been ported to a wide range of operating systems, such as BSD, Linux, macOS, Solaris and Windows. The Windows port lacks an embedded terminal window; also missing from the Windows version are the external development tools present under Unix, unless installed separately by the user. Among the supported programming languages and markup languages are C, C++, C#, Java, JavaScript, PHP, HTML, LaTeX, CSS, Python, Perl, Ruby, Pascal, Haskell, Erlang, Vala and many others.

In contrast to traditional Unix-based editors like Emacs or Vim, Geany more closely resembles programming editors common on Microsoft Windows such as Notepad++, which also uses Scintilla.

It is free software licensed under the terms of the GNU GPL version 2 or later. In 2012, the version number was increased to 1.22 from 0.21 to reflect the maturity of the product, as requested by many users. Geany Version 1.29 is based by GTK+ 3.22. Version 1.36 is based by GTK+ 3.24.14. Version 1.37.1 is last Version with GTK+ 2.24 support.

Features

 Auto-completion
 Bookmarks (called markers)
 Multiple document support
 Simple project management
 Syntax highlighting
 Code folding (partially)
 Symbol lists
 Code navigation
 Embedded terminal emulator
 Build system to compile and execute code using external tools
 Extensible via plugins
 Column / block / vertical select (via Shift + Ctrl + arrow keys)
 User configurable keyboard action to editor function mapping

Rankings
In 2018, Geany entered the top 10 integrated development environments for Python in The Indian Wire.
In 2021, Geany was named as one of the 12 best Linux text editors in Fossbytes.

See also
 
 Comparison of integrated development environments
 Code::Blocks

References

External links

 
 

Code navigation tools
Free integrated development environments
Free software programmed in C
Free text editors
GNOME Applications
GNOME Developer Tools
Linux integrated development environments
Linux text editors
Software that uses Scintilla
Software using the GPL license
Text editors that use GTK
MacOS text editors
Unix text editors
Windows text editors
Cross-platform free software